Acartauchenius derisor is a species of sheet weaver found in France. It was described by Simon in 1918.

References

Linyphiidae
Spiders described in 1918
Spiders of Europe